Castleichthys is a genus in the conger eel family, Congridae. It contains the single species Castleichthys auritus, the eared conger.

The name of the genus commemorates the ichthyologist P. J. H. Castle.

References

External links
 Castleichthys auritus - Atlas of Living Australia 

Congridae